Doorways of My Mind (subtitled Live at NSC) is the first live album by Australian singer-songwriter Lior. The album was recorded at the Northcote Social Club during the Autumn Flow album tour in November 2005. The album was released in February 2006.

At the ARIA Music Awards of 2006, the album was nominated for two awards; Best Blues & Roots Album and Best Independent Release.

Track listing
 "Daniel" – 3:59	
 "Sittting with a Stranger" – 4:25
 "Gypsy Girl" – 3:12		
 "Grey Ocean" – 4:53		
 "Building Ships" – 4:41	
 "Autumn Flow" – 4:47
 "Bedouin Song" – 3:32		
 "Diego & the Village Girl" – 5:12	
 "Avinu Malkeinu" – 1:34	
 "Burying Chances" – 5:58		
 "This Old Love" – 4:28

Personnel
 Lior – vocals, guitar
 Brett Hirst – bass
 Michelle Wood – cello
 Michael Iveson – drums, backing vocals
 Ben Fink – electric guitar, backing vocals
 James Wilkinson – trombone
 Reuben Zylberszpic – trumpet
 Charlotte Armstrong – violin
 Lerida Delbridge – violin

Charts

Release history

References

2006 live albums
Live albums by Australian artists
Lior albums